The VCU Rams men's basketball team is the intercollegiate men's basketball team that represents Virginia Commonwealth University. The Rams joined the Atlantic 10 Conference in the 2012–13 season after previously competing in the Colonial Athletic Association (CAA). In 2017, VCU was ranked the 40th most valuable men's basketball program in the country by The Wall Street Journal.  With a valuation of $56.9 million, VCU ranked second in the Commonwealth of Virginia, and second in the A-10 Conference. The team is coached by Mike Rhoades.

Since 1999, the team has played home basketball games at the E.J. Wade Arena at the Stuart C. Siegel Center in Richmond, Virginia on the university's Monroe Park campus. Virginia Commonwealth has made it to the NCAA Final Four once in its program's history, in 2011. Additionally, the Rams won the 2010 CBI tournament and have ten conference tournaments; three being in the Sun Belt Conference, five being in the Colonial Athletic Association, and two in the Atlantic 10 Conference. The Rams have also won twelve regular season championships; four from the Sun Belt, five from the CAA, and three in the Atlantic 10.  The official student supporter group is known as the Rowdy Rams.

The team is known for its Final Four run in the 2011 NCAA Division I men's basketball tournament.  While the team had made nine NCAA Tournament appearances beforehand, never had the Rams made it beyond the second round of the tournament.  In 2011, the Rams' journey to the Final Four began in one of the four opening round games, commonly called "play-in" games, intended to narrow the field from 68 to 64 teams.  Thus, VCU became the first team to advance from the "First Four" to the Final Four.

In another NCAA Tournament-first, VCU became the first team ever to forfeit a game in the NCAA Tournament when their First Round game in the 2021 NCAA tournament was declared a no-contest due to several positive COVID-19 tests in the VCU program.

VCU reached the NCAA tournament a state record seven consecutive times from 2011 to 2017.

History 
The VCU Rams men's basketball program was founded in 1968, at the same time as the merger of the Richmond Professional Institute and the Medical College of Virginia. In the 1968–69 season as an independent team, the program played its first ever season. Coached by Benny Dees and assisted by Landy Watson and Vann Brackin for their first two seasons, Dees led the team to two winning records, before being replaced by Chuck Noe. It would take 10 more seasons before the Rams appeared in a postseason tournament, earning a berth into the 1978 National Invitation Tournament being eliminated in the first round by the University of Detroit.

Under the coaching of J.D. Barnett, the Rams earned fourth berths into the NCAA Men's Division I Basketball Championship, each being their first four berths, the first coming in 1980. During Barnett's six years coaching the team, only twice did the Rams not win the Sun Belt Conference.

The Rams became the first team to sweep the best of 3 championship series in the CBI post-season tournament on their way to becoming the 2010 CBI Champions.  It is the first post-season tournament championship, excluding conference tournaments, in the history of the program.

The Sun Belt Years
VCU received their first bid to the NCAA Tournament in the 1979–1980 season with an 18–12 overall record and Sun Belt Conference tournament championship led by then first-year VCU Head Coach J.D. Barnett in VCU's first season in the Sun Belt. They entered the tournament as a #12 seed in the East Region and were eliminated in the first round by #5 Iowa.

It would not be long before the Rams returned to the tournament. The following year the Rams posted a 24–5 record on their way to the Sun Belt Conference regular season and Conference tournament championships. The Rams entered the tournament as the #5 seed in the East region and defeated #12 Long Island before being eliminated by #4 Tennessee in overtime in the second round 56–58.

The Rams would return to the tournament in 1983. The Rams, the #5 seed in the East region, defeated #12 seed La Salle in the first round and were eliminated in the second round by #4 seed Georgia 54–56. The Rams lost their second-round game by the same margin to #4 Tennessee in 1981. The 1984 tournament held similar results for the Rams squad.  They entered the tournament as a #6 seed in the East Region and defeated #11 Northeastern before being eliminated by #3 Syracuse. The second-round losses in the NCAA Tournament by VCU in 1981, 1983, and 1984 were to teams with first-round byes before the tournament expanded to 64 teams for the 1984–1985 season and byes were eliminated.

In the 1984–85 season the Rams once again made it to the newly expanded 1985 NCAA Tournament.  The Rams entered the tournament as the #2 seed in the West region, the highest seeding they have ever received in the tournament.  The Rams defeated #15 Marshall in the first round, but unfortunately their luck had not changed in the second-round and they were upset by #7 Alabama 63–59.

During his tenure, Head Coach J.D Barnett (1979–1985) led VCU and the Rams to five NCAA Tournament appearances (1980, 1981, 1983, 1984, 1985) while capturing four Sun Belt regular season conference championships (1981, 1983, 1984, 1985) and three Sun Belt Conference tournament championships (1980, 1981, 1985).  He was 132–48 overall and 59–19 in conference play during his time at VCU.

The Rams next stint in the post-season came under Head Coach Mike Pollio in the 1988 NIT Tournament where they would reach the quarter-finals before ultimately falling to UConn 60–69.  The Rams posted wins over Marshall and Southern Mississippi in the first and second rounds, respectively.

The Rams remained in the Sun Belt Conference until 1991 when they joined the Metro Conference. VCU was left out of the 1995 merger of the Metro and Great Midwest Conference that created Conference USA. They instead joined the Colonial Athletic Association (CAA) for the 1995–1996 season.

The CAA Days
In their first season as members of the CAA, the Rams posted a 24–9 overall record, going 14–2 in conference play en route to the CAA regular season and conference tournament championships. The Rams earned the right to go dancing in the NCAA Tournament for the first time since 1985, but fell in the first round as the #12 seed in the Southeast region to #5 Mississippi State.

Jeff Capel era
The VCU men's basketball team would return to prominence in the 2003–2004 season under then second-year Head Coach Jeff Capel. Following a 2nd place conference finish in his debut season, Capel led the Rams to a 23–8 overall record, going 14–4 in conference play and capturing the CAA regular season and conference tournament championships.  In the 2004 NCAA Tournament, the Rams were awarded the #13 seed in the East region and faced #4 Wake Forest in the first round.  VCU led for much of the second half and had a chance to win towards the end despite the Wake Forest comeback, but ultimately fell 79–78.

Jeff Capel originally joined VCU as an assistant in 2001 and at the time of his promotion to the head coaching position in 2002 was the youngest head coach in Division I NCAA basketball at 27 years old. During his time as the head coach with VCU, Capel compiled a 79–41 record. In April 2006, Capel resigned as head coach to accept the same position with the University of Oklahoma Sooners. He was replaced by Anthony Grant, formerly an assistant and associate head coach for several years to Billy Donovan, including the 2006 NCAA champions, the University of Florida Gators.

Anthony Grant era
In his first year as head coach, Anthony Grant led the Rams to a school-record 28 wins.  The Rams finished the season 28–7, also setting a school and CAA conference record with 16 wins in conference play.  Grant, who also set a school record for most wins by a first-year head coach, was named the CAA Coach of the Year.  The Rams were 16–2 in conference play and captured the CAA Regular Season Championship before capturing the CAA Conference tournament Championship in thrilling fashion as Eric Maynor burst onto the national scene by scoring 9 points in the final 1:55 to bury the George Mason Patriots, finishing with 14 of his 20 points in the second half. Maynor also had 7 rebounds, 4 assists and 3 steals in the victory.

The Rams entered the 2007 NCAA tournament as the #11 seed in the West region and upset the #6 seed Duke Blue Devils 79–77 on a game-winning bucket from just beyond the free-throw line by Eric Maynor in the final seconds of the game.

The Rams good fortune did not continue into the next round, however, where they were eliminated by the #3 seed Pittsburgh Panthers.  The Rams squad showed outstanding poise in the second-half by forcing overtime after trailing 26–41 at halftime.  They would go on to lose by a score of 79–84.

The next year the Rams would win their second straight CAA regular season championship, posting a 24–8 overall record, 15–3 in conference play, but fall short in the conference tournament in a heartbreaking upset to William & Mary in the semi-finals.  The Rams missed an at-large bid for the NCAA Tournament but instead received an invitation to play in the NIT.  The Rams heartbreak continued as they were upset on their home court in the first round by old-time Sun Belt Conference rival, the UAB Blazers 80–77 as a late comeback fell just short.

The 2008–2009 season was another successful one for the VCU program.  The Rams finished the season with a mark of 24–10 overall, going 14–4 in a hotly contested CAA and sealing the deal on a three-peat as CAA regular season champions for only the second time in CAA conference history and the second time in school history, the first coming during the Rams time in the Sun Belt Conference.  The Rams would not fall short again and captured the CAA Conference tournament championship for the fourth time since joining the conference capped by a 71–50 rout of rival George Mason in the final.  The 21-point margin is the largest margin of victory in a CAA Conference tournament Championship Game.  Larry Sanders set CAA Conference tournament Championship Game records for the Rams with 20 rebounds and 7 blocks in the victory.

So once again, the Rams headed to the NCAA Tournament as a #11 seed in the East region.  The Rams were eliminated by the #6 seed UCLA Bruins in a hard-fought game 65–64.

Anthony Grant posted an impressive 76–25 record in his three seasons as the head men's basketball coach at VCU.  He was an outright dominating 52–10 versus CAA opponents, including conference tournaments, capturing three straight CAA Regular Season Conference Championships and two CAA Conference tournament championships. He led VCU to two NCAA Tournament berths and one NIT berth before departing the program to take over the head coaching position at the University of Alabama. Eric Maynor would go on to be drafted #20 in the 2009 NBA draft by the Utah Jazz.

Shaka Smart era

From 2009 to 2015, the Rams were led by Shaka Smart, who had been previously an assistant coach for the Florida Gators men's basketball team. Prior to Florida, Smart served as an assistant coach at Clemson, Akron and California (Pa.) and a director of operations at Dayton.  During his introductory press conference, he promised that his teams would "wreak havoc on our opponents [sic] psyche and their plan of attack." Smart's teams have employed a basketball philosophy nicknamed Havoc since that point.

In Smart's first year as the Rams head coach, the team posted a 27–9 record, going 11–7 in the CAA, finishing fifth in the conference. As fifth seeds, the Rams made it to the semi-finals of the 2010 CAA men's basketball tournament before falling to their conference rivals, Old Dominion, who would go on to win the CAA Championship. Despite reaching the semifinals of the CAA Tournament, the Rams did not earn a berth into either the NCAA or NIT tournaments. However, the Rams earned a berth into the 2010 College Basketball Invitational, where they would finish as the eventual champions, defeating Saint Louis 2–0 in the series final. Their sweep of Saint Louis made it the first time in CBI history a team won the best two-out-of-three championship series in two games. Additionally, it was VCU's first postseason tournament, other than the Sun Belt and CAA tournaments, that the program won.

On Selection Sunday 2011, the VCU Rams received an at-large bid to the 2011 NCAA Division I men's basketball tournament to start off the newly created 68-team field. VCU found itself as one of the last teams in the tournament and was scheduled to play in the newly formed "First Four" against USC on March 16 for a spot as the 11th seed in the tournament. The inclusion of VCU in the tournament was widely criticized by pundits and the ESPN network, in particular Jay Bilas and Dick Vitale. In the first round of the NCAA tournament, dubbed by many as "The First Four", The Rams succeeded in knocking off USC by the score of 59–46. The Rams blew out Georgetown 74–56 in Chicago to reach the Round of 32 and followed this win up with a 94–76 rout of third-seeded Purdue to advance to VCU's first-ever Sweet Sixteen appearance. VCU then beat Florida State 72–71 in overtime on a last second shot by Bradford Burgess to advance to the school's first ever Elite Eight appearance.

The Rams upset the number one seeded Kansas Jayhawks 71–61 to reach the Final Four for the first time ever. VCU, the Southwest Regional champions played in the National Semifinal against the Southeast Region champion Butler Bulldogs, losing 70–62. The VCU Rams finished sixth in the ESPN/USA Today Coaches Poll at the end of the season. This was the highest ranking in VCU's history and the highest ranking of any team from the CAA.  The 2011 NCAA tournament run by VCU is regarded as one of the best Cinderella runs of all time. Their First Four appearance, combined with their run to the Final Four, gave VCU the distinction of being the first team to win five games in the men's NCAA tournament without reaching the championship game.

The Atlantic 10 Days
The major conference realignment of the early 2010s eventually gave VCU the opportunity for a major basketball upgrade. After A10 mainstay Temple announced its departure for the Big East Conference and Charlotte announced it would return to Conference USA, the A10 reloaded by adding Butler and VCU. The move placed VCU in a conference that regularly collected NCAA at-large bids—the A10 had 20 teams earn at-large bids from 2000 through 2012, including three in the 2012 tournament. By comparison, the CAA had only four at-large bids in the same period (one of them being VCU's 2011 Final Four team).

On Sunday, March 15, 2015, VCU won its first Atlantic 10 conference tournament championship.

On April 2, 2015, Smart left VCU to go to the University of Texas.

Will Wade era
After two seasons at Chattanooga, Will Wade returned to VCU to take the open head coaching position vacated by Shaka Smart.  In his first season returning to VCU, Wade guided the team to their first ever A10 Conference regular season championship and a 25–11 overall record.  VCU made it to the championship game of the A10 conference tournament for the 4th straight season, falling to St. Joseph's.  The team won at least 24 games, VCU and Kansas are the only NCAA schools to reach that feat the last 10 seasons.  The Rams also made their 6th straight NCAA tournament, one of only 8 teams in the country to do so.  VCU made it to the round of 32 where they fell to Oklahoma 85–81.  Wade finished second in voting for A10 coach of the year. Wade announced that he was leaving VCU after two years to accept the head coaching position at Louisiana State University in Baton Rouge.

Mike Rhoades era
On  March 21, 2017, VCU announced that the school had hired former associate head coach under Shaka Smart, Mike Rhoades, as the Rams' new head basketball coach.  He was formerly the head coach at Rice University in Houston.  He is the 12th coach in program history.

Coaches 
In the team's existence, the Rams have had 12 different head coaches. Benny Dees coached the team for the first two seasons of existence. During Dees' tenure, the team achieved winning records both seasons, but barely pulled ahead of .500, resulting in Dees being fired. The second coach, Chuck Noe, led the team for the next six seasons.

Following Noe's departure as head coach in 1976, Dana Kirk became the third head coach in Rams basketball history. Kirk, formerly assistant to Denny Crum, was part of the University of Louisville team that reached the Final Four in 1976. In Kirk's second season with the team, he led them to a 24–5 record, and a berth into the National Invitational Tournament, making it the first time the team reached any major tournament. Although the team was eliminated in the first round, the success of the program Kirk built continued into the following season. Kirk's success with the Rams resulted in him being hired as the head coach at Memphis State (now Memphis) in 1979.

Subsequently, the Rams earned an invitation to play in the Sun Belt Conference and hired J. D. Barnett as their head coach. Barnett, who coached the team from 1979 through 1985, immediately brought NCAA success to the team, earning berths into the NCAA tournament five of the six seasons in his tenure, as well as being the four-time Sun Belt champions. Barnet's success eventually led to him being offered a contract to coach at Tulsa.

Mike Pollio became the fifth coach in Rams history. The head coach from 1985 until 1989, Pollio had a rather lackluster record with the team. During his four years as coach, Pollio had two seasons with losing records, the first in Rams history. During his four years, Pollio managed to get the team into the NIT quarterfinals.

{| class="wikitable sortable"
|-
! Years !! Coach !! Seasons !! Overall Record !! Conference Record 
|-
| 2017–present || Mike Rhoades || 5 || 94–50 (0.653) || A-10: 50–28 (.641)
|-
| 2015–2017 || Will Wade || 2 || 51–20 (.718) || A-10: 28–8 (.778)
|-
| 2009–2015 || Shaka Smart || 6 || 163–56 (.744) || CAA/A-10: 74–30 (.712)
|-
| 2006–2009 || Anthony Grant || 3 || 76–25 (.752) || CAA: 45–9 (.833)
|-
| 2002–2006 || Jeff Capel || 4 || 79–41 (.658) || CAA: 50–22 (.694)
|-
| 1998–2002 || Mack McCarthy || 4 || 66–55 (.545) || CAA: 35–31 (.530)
|-
| 1989–1998 || Sonny Smith || 9 || 136–127 (.517) || Sun Belt/Metro/CAA: 59–65 (.476)
|-
| 1985–1989 || Mike Pollio || 4 || 65–57 (.533) || Sun Belt: 32–24 (.571)
|-
| 1979–1985 || J. D. Barnett || 6 || 132–48 (.733) || Sun Belt: 59–19 (.756)
|-
| 1976–1979 || Dana Kirk || 3 || 57–23 (.712) ||
|-
| 1970–1976 || Chuck Noe || 6 || 95–42 (.693) ||
|-
| 1968–1970 || Benny Dees || 2 || 25–21 (.543) ||
|-
| Totals || 12 Coaches || 49 || 1025–558 (.646) || 407–219 (.650)|}

 Facilities 

The Rams play at the E.J. Wade Arena, formerly Verizon Wireless Arena, the Stuart C. Siegel Center, located in the northwest corridor of the Monroe Park campus. University-owned, the Siegel Center broke ground for construction April 1996, and opened three years later, in May 1999.  Since the 1999–00 season, the venue has been the home arena for the Rams, as well as the women's basketball team and volleyball team.

Prior to the opening of the Siegel Center, the Rams spent a majority of their history playing their home basketball games in the Richmond Coliseum, which housed the team from 1971 until 1999. Prior to the Rams' long-term occupation of the Coliseum, the team played their home games in the Franklin Street Gym.

Practice facility
A $25 million practice facility located on the north side of Marshall Street adjacent to the Siegel Center was completed in November 2015. Replacing the decades-old Franklin Street Gym, it houses the Men's and Women's basketball teams.

 Rivals 

The Rams have three major rivals: Old Dominion, George Mason and their long-standing crosstown rival University of Richmond.

In the 1970s, their first six games were decided at the buzzer. For the past 35 years, the two schools have competed annually in the Capital City Classic (formerly Black & Blue Classic).  The success of the two school's basketball programs was highlighted in the 2011 NCAA tournament, as Richmond and VCU respectively reached the Sweet Sixteen and Final Four.

 Players 

 Honored jerseys 
VCU has honored six players by retiring their jerseys, although the numbers remained active:

 Individual career records 

 Points 
 Eric Maynor – 1,953
 Treveon Graham – 1,882
 Kendrick Warren – 1,858
 Charles Wilkins – 1,716
 Bradford Burgess – 1,684
 Melvin Johnson – 1,657
 Phil Stinnie – 1,645
 Calvin Duncan – 1,630
 Domonic Jones – 1,616
 Jesse Dark – 1,584

 Rebounds 
 Lorenza Watson – 1,143
 Kendrick Warren – 1,049
Justin Tillman – 922
 Juvonte Reddic – 895
 Bernard Harris – 839
 Treveon Graham – 803

 Assists 
 Eric Maynor – 674
 Edmund Sherod – 582
 Joey Rodriguez – 580
 Rolando Lamb – 550
 LaMar Taylor – 527
 JeQuan Lewis – 505
 Darius Theus – 462
 Dave Edwards – 430
 Sherman Hamilton – 417
 Calvin Duncan – 404

 Steals 
 Brianté Weber – 374 *
 Rolando Lamb – 257
 Joey Rodriguez – 237
 Darius Theus – 237
 JeQuan Lewis – 205
 Edmund Sherod – 202
 LaMar Taylor – 193
 Eric Maynor – 168
 Juvonte Reddic – 160
 Rob Brandenberg – 159

 Blocked shots 
 Lorenza Watson – 391
 Larry Sanders – 277
 Mo Alie-Cox – 255
 L. F. Likcholitov – 207
 Kendrick Warren – 193
 Sherron Mills – 134
 Juvonte Reddic – 123
 Kenny Stancell – 117
 George Byrd – 116
 Justin Tillman – 102

Source: 

 Players in the NBA Source Players in international leagues 

Marcus Evans (born 1996) plays for the Bristol Flyers in the British Basketball League
Juvonte Reddic (born 1992), basketball player in the Israeli Basketball Premier League
Justin Tillman (born 1996), basketball player for Hapoel Tel Aviv in the Israeli Basketball Premier League

 Other notable players 
 Mo Alie-Cox currently plays tight end for the NFL's Indianapolis Colts.

 Results by season 

Most recent:

Postseason

 NCAA tournament results 
The Rams have appeared in 19 NCAA Tournaments. VCU's combined record is 13–19.

^Oregon advanced due to positive COVID-19 tests in VCU's program

 NCAA tournament seeding history The NCAA began seeding the tournament with the 1979 edition.''

NIT results
The Rams have appeared in the National Invitation Tournament (NIT) five times. Their combined record is 3–6.

CBI results
The Rams have appeared in the College Basketball Invitational (CBI) one time. Their record is 5–0 and they were CBI champions in 2010.

VCU vs. the AP Top 25 (since 2009–10)
Since the 2009–10 season, VCU has played a total of 37 games against teams ranked in the AP Top 25 Poll. VCU has a record of 12–25 against such teams. They have a record of 1–5 against teams in the Top 5 during this span, the lone win coming against #2 Kansas during the 2011 NCAA tournament in which Kansas was a #1 seed. The Rams also hold a record of 5–4 against ranked teams at the Siegel Center since the arena first opened in 1999.

BracketBuster games
From 2005 to 2012, VCU had participated in ESPN's BracketBusters series, in which the Rams would play against another team from a mid-major conference. VCU's record during this series was 5–3, going 3–1 at home. Scores in bold represent games in which VCU was the home team.

See also
 Mike Rhoades
 Siegel Center
 VCU Rams
 Atlantic 10 Conference
 Capital City Classic
 Old Dominion–VCU men's basketball rivalry
 George Mason–VCU rivalry
 VCU Rams women's basketball

Footnotes

References
General
 VCU Records
Notes

External links